Raptor is a family of full-flow staged-combustion-cycle rocket engines developed and manufactured by SpaceX for use on the SpaceX Starship. The engine is powered by cryogenic liquid methane and liquid oxygen ("methalox") compared to the RP-1 and liquid oxygen ("kerolox") combination used in SpaceX's prior Merlin and Kestrel rocket engines. The Raptor engine has triple the thrust of SpaceX's Merlin 1D engine that powers the Falcon 9 and Falcon Heavy launch vehicles.

Raptor is used in the Starship system in both the super-heavy-lift Super Heavy booster and in the Starship spacecraft which acts as the second stage when launched from Earth and as an independent spacecraft in LEO and beyond. Starship is planned to be used in various applications, including Earth-orbit satellite delivery, deployment of a large portion of SpaceX's Starlink satellite constellation, exploration, Moon landing, and colonization of Mars.

History

Conception and initial designs 
An advanced rocket engine design project named Raptor, burning hydrogen and oxygen propellants, was first publicly discussed by SpaceX's Max Vozoff at the American Institute of Aeronautics and Astronautics Commercial Crew/Cargo symposium in 2009. SpaceX had a few staff working on the Raptor upper-stage engine, then still a /LOX concept, at a low level of priority. Further mention of the development program occurred in 2011. In March 2012, news accounts asserted that the Raptor upper-stage engine development program was underway, but that details were not being publicly released.

In October 2012, SpaceX publicly announced concept work on a rocket engine that would be "several times as powerful as the Merlin 1 series of engines, and won't use Merlin's RP-1 fuel", but declined to specify which fuel would be used.

Development 

In November 2012, Musk announced a new direction for the propulsion division of SpaceX which was towards developing methane-fueled rocket engines. He further indicated that the Raptor concept would now become a methane-based design and that methane would be the fuel of choice for SpaceX's plans for Mars colonization. Because of the presence of water underground and carbon dioxide in the atmosphere of Mars, methane, a simple hydrocarbon, can easily be synthesized on Mars using the Sabatier reaction. In-situ resource production on Mars has been examined by NASA and found to be viable for oxygen, water, and methane production.

When first mentioned by SpaceX in 2009, the term "Raptor" was applied exclusively to an upper-stage engine concept—and 2012 pronouncements indicated that it was then still a concept for an upper stage engine—but in early 2014 SpaceX confirmed that Raptor would be used both on a new second stage, as well as for the large (then, nominally a 10-meter-diameter) core of the Mars Colonial Transporter (subsequently, in 2016, on both stages of the Interplanetary Transport System and then, in 2017 on the Big Falcon Rocket).

Public information released in November 2012 indicated that SpaceX might have a family of Raptor-designated rocket engines in mind; this was confirmed by SpaceX in October 2013. However, in March 2014 SpaceX COO Gwynne Shotwell clarified that the focus of the new engine development program is exclusively on the full-size Raptor engine; smaller subscale methalox engines were not planned on the development path to the very large Raptor engine.

In October 2013, SpaceX announced that they would be performing methane engine tests of Raptor engine components at NASA's John C. Stennis Space Center and that SpaceX would add equipment to the existing test stand infrastructure to support liquid methane and hot gaseous methane engine component testing. In April 2014, SpaceX completed the requisite upgrades and maintenance to the Stennis test stand to prepare for testing of Raptor components, and the engine component testing program began in earnest, focusing on the development of robust startup and shutdown procedures. Component testing at Stennis also allowed hardware characterization and verification.

SpaceX successfully began development testing of injectors in 2014 and completed a full-power test of a full-scale oxygen preburner in 2015. 76 hot-fire tests of the preburner, totaling some 400 seconds of test time, were executed from April–August 2015. SpaceX completed its planned testing using NASA Stennis facilities in 2014 and 2015.

In January 2016, the US Air Force awarded a  development contract to SpaceX to develop a prototype version of its methane-fueled reusable Raptor engine for use on the upper stage of the Falcon 9 and Falcon Heavy launch vehicles. Work under the contract was expected to be completed in 2018, with engine performance testing to be done at Stennis Space Center and at Los Angeles Air Force Base, California.

Testing 

Initial development testing of Raptor methane engine components was done at NASA's Stennis Space Center, where SpaceX added equipment to the existing infrastructure to support liquid methane engine testing.The development Raptor engine discussed in the October 2013 time frame relative to Stennis testing was designed to generate more than  vacuum thrust. Raptor engine component testing began in May 2014 at the E-2 test complex which SpaceX modified to support methane engine tests. SpaceX completed a "round of main injector testing in late 2014" and a "full-power test of the oxygen preburner component" for Raptor by June 2015.

By early 2016, SpaceX had constructed a new engine test stand at their McGregor test site in central Texas for Raptor testing. By August 2016, the first integrated Raptor rocket engine, manufactured at the SpaceX Hawthorne facility in California, was shipped to SpaceX McGregor for development testing. The engine had  thrust, less than half the thrust of the full-scale Raptor engine used for flight tests in 2019. It is the first full-flow staged-combustion methalox engine ever to reach a test stand. It performed an initial 9-second firing test on 26 September 2016, the day before Musk's talk at the International Aeronautical Congress.

On 26 September 2016, Elon Musk disclosed that the engine used multi-stage turbopumps. Substantial additional technical details of the ITS propulsion were summarized in an article on the Raptor engine published the next week. In September 2016, at the 67th International Astronautical Congress, Musk mentioned several Raptor engine designs that were planned for the Interplanetary Transport System. In addition, a much smaller subscale development engine had already been built for design validation. At that time, this first subscale Raptor development engine had recently been tested on a ground test stand in McGregor, but for only one brief firing. The Raptor subscale development engine produced approximately  thrust. To eliminate flow separation problems while being tested in Earth's atmosphere, the test nozzle expansion ratio had been limited to 150. NASASpaceFlight reported that the development engine was only one-third the size of any of the several larger engine designs that were discussed for the later flight vehicles.

By September 2017, the development Raptor engine—with  chamber pressure—had undergone 1200 seconds of test fire testing in ground-test stands across 42 main engine tests, with the longest test being 100 seconds, which is limited by the capacity of the ground-test propellant tanks. This alloy is known as SX500, created by the SpaceX metallurgy team which is used to contain hot oxygen gas in the engine at up to 12000 psi.

Heavy-lift vehicles 

While plans for Raptor flight testing have consistently been on the new-generation fiber-composite-material construction flight vehicles since 2016, the specific vehicle was not clarified until October 2017, when it was indicated that initial suborbital test flights would occur with a Big Falcon Ship. In November 2016, the first flight tests of the Raptor engine were projected to be on the Interplanetary Transport System, no earlier than the early 2020s. By July 2017, the plan had been modified to do flight testing on a much smaller launch vehicle and spacecraft, and the new system architecture had "evolved quite a bit" since the ITS concept in 2016. A key driver of the 2017 architecture was to make the new system useful for substantial Earth-orbit and cislunar launches so that the new system might pay for itself, in part, through economic spaceflight activities in the near-Earth space zone.

Elon Musk announced in September 2017 that the initial flight platform for any Raptor engine would be some part of the Big Falcon Rocket. BFR was a -diameter launch vehicle. In October 2017, Musk clarified that "[initial flight testing will be with] a full-scale 9-meter-diameter ship doing short hops of a few hundred kilometers altitude and lateral distance ... [projected to be] fairly easy on the vehicle, as no heat shield is needed, we can have a large amount of reserve propellant and don't need the high area ratio, deep-space Raptor engines."

In addition, three gimbaled sea-level Raptor engines would be used for performing landings of the ITS second stage on Earth and Mars. Six vacuum-optimized Raptor engines, providing  of thrust each, would also be used on the ITS second stage, for a total of nine engines. The higher-efficiency Raptor Vacuum engines for in-space conditions were envisioned then to target a specific impulse of 382s, using a much larger nozzle giving an expansion ratio of 200. Six of these non-gimbaled engines were planned to provide primary propulsion for the 2016 designs of the ITS second stage.

A year later, at the 68th IAC in September 2017, and following a year of development by the propulsion team, Musk said that a smaller Raptor engine—with slightly over half as much thrust as the previous concept designs for the ITS — would be used on the next-generation rocket, now a -diameter launch vehicle and publicly referred to as Big Falcon Rocket (BFR). With the much smaller launch vehicle, fewer Raptor engines would be used on each stage. BFR was then slated to have 31 Raptors on the first stage and 6 on the second stage.

In the BFR update given in September 2018, Musk showed a video of a 71-second fire test of a Raptor engine, and stated that "this is the Raptor engine that will power BFR, both the ship and the booster; it's the same engine. ... approximately a 200 (metric) tons engine aiming for roughly 300 bar chamber pressure. ... If you had it at a high expansion ratio, has the potential to have a specific impulse of 380."

Production 
In July 2021, SpaceX announced that they would be building a second production facility for Raptor engines, this one in south Texas near the existing rocket engine test facility. Dallas Morning News reported in July that SpaceX will "break ground soon" and that the facility will concentrate on the serial production of Raptor 2, while the California facility will produce Raptor Vacuum and new/experimental Raptor designs. The new facility is expected to eventually produce 800 to 1000 rocket engines each year. SpaceX aims at a lifetime of 1000 flights for Raptor. In 2019 the (marginal) cost of the engine was stated to be approaching $1 million. SpaceX plans to mass-produce up to 500 Raptor engines per year, each costing less than $250,000. Each Starship booster will use 33 sea-level Raptors, while each Starship spacecraft will use 3 sea-level Raptors plus 3 Vacuum-optimized Raptors.

By late 2021, SpaceX said that scaling Raptor production to support the frequent Starship test program planned for 2022 was "currently the biggest constraint on how many vehicles we can make" and that failing to achieve a flight rate of at least once every two weeks by late 2022 would open up the possibility of bankruptcy for SpaceX. The reason given was that Starship orbital launch capability is necessary to deliver the next generation Starlink satellites needed to operationalize the massively capital-intensive Starlink broadband internet constellation.

Raptor Vacuum 

Raptor Vacuum (also RVac) is a variant of Raptor with an extended, regeneratively-cooled nozzle for higher specific impulse in the vacuum of space. While the vacuum-optimized Raptor engine is aiming for a specific impulse of ~, the v1.0 Raptor vac design to support early Starship development has been made more conservative and is projecting a specific impulse of only , intentionally decreasing engine performance to obtain test engines sooner. In addition, Raptor Vacuum v1 will have a smaller engine nozzle to avoid flow separation when the engine is fired at sea-level atmospheric pressure. A full-duration test of version 1 of the Raptor Vacuum engine was completed in September 2020 at the SpaceX development facility in McGregor, Texas. The first three operational Raptor Vacuum engines were slated to fly on SpaceX Starship prototype S20 and were installed on 4 August 2021. However, SN20 was retired before it flew.

Raptor 2 
Raptor 2 is the newest version of Raptor and is a complete redesign of the version 1 Raptor engine. The turbomachinery, chamber, nozzle, and electronics were all redesigned, as well as deleting some parts and converting many flanges to welds. And has been consistently improved with many other simplifications as they build them. 

In September 2019, SpaceX stated their "current plan" was to use Raptor 2 for the three "sea-level" engines on the Starship second-stage and also for all booster engines — both those that gimbal and those that do not — on the Super Heavy first stage. As of February 2023, no Raptor 2 engines have flown on the various Starship prototype vehicles. These engines are currently being produced at SpaceX's engine development facility near McGregor, Texas. On 18 December 2021, Elon Musk announced on his Twitter account that Raptor 2 started production, and it will have over 230 tons of force.  In a Starship update on 10 February 2022, Musk showed the capabilities of Raptor 2 and how it is simplified but more powerful than the original Raptor.

Raptor 2 engines were achieving  of thrust consistently by February 2022, although SpaceX expects to be able to tune engine parameters and design over time to achieve at least .  Moreover, Musk indicated that the engine production cost was approximately half that of the Raptor 1 version SpaceX had been using in 2018–2021. In June 2022, Musk tweeted that 250 tons was achievable.

SpaceX have now completed many static fire tests on a vehicle using raptor 2's, including a 31 engine test (intended to be 33) on the 9th February 2023. 

Production rate for Raptor 2 had reached five per week by February 2022 and has now reached 1.8 a day as of February 2023.

Components 

The Raptor engine is powered by subcooled liquid methane, and subcooled liquid oxygen in a full-flow staged combustion cycle. This is a departure from the simpler "open-cycle" gas generator system and LOX/kerosene propellants that the current Merlin engines use. Also, the RS-25 engines (which were first used on the Space Shuttle) use a simpler form of a staged combustion cycle, as do several Russian rocket engines, including the RD-180 and the RD-191. 

The Raptor engine is designed for the use of deep cryogenic propellants—fluids cooled to near their freezing points, rather than using the cryo-propellants at their boiling points as it is more typical for cryogenic rocket engines. The use of subcooled propellants increases propellant density to allow more propellant mass to be stored within the vehicle's tanks. Engine performance is also increased with subcooled propellants. Specific impulse is increased, and the risk of cavitation at inputs to the turbopumps is reduced due to the higher propellant fuel mass flow rate per unit of power generated. The oxidizer to fuel ratio of the engine would be approximately 3.8 to 1, as stated by Elon Musk.

Engine ignition for all Raptor engines, both on the pad and in flight, was handled by dual-redundant spark-plug lit torch igniters, eliminating the need for a dedicated, consumable igniter fluid, as used on Merlin. This was changed for Raptor 2 engines where the lit torches were replaced by a secret ignition method that is allegedly less complex, lighter, cheaper and more reliable. Torch igniters are still used in oxygen and power heads.

Raptor has been claimed to be able to deliver "long life ... and more benign turbine environments". Specifically, Raptor utilizes a full-flow staged combustion cycle, where all the oxygen will power an oxygen turbopump, and all the fuel will power a methane turbopump. Both streams—oxidizer and fuel—will be mixed completely in the gas phase before they enter the combustion chamber. Before 2014, only two full-flow staged-combustion rocket engine designs had ever progressed sufficiently to be tested on test stands: the Soviet RD-270 project in the 1960s and the Aerojet Rocketdyne Integrated Powerhead Demonstrator in the mid-2000s. The flight engine is designed for extreme reliability, aiming to support the airline-level of safety required by the point-to-point Earth transportation market.

Many components of early Raptor prototypes were manufactured using 3D printing, including turbopumps and injectors, with the effect of increasing the speed of development and iterative testing. The 2016 subscale development engine had 40% (by mass) of its parts manufactured by 3D printing. In 2019, engine manifolds were cast from SpaceX's in-house developed SX300 Inconel superalloy, soon to be changed to SX500. The Raptor engine uses a large number of coaxial swirl injectors to admit propellants to the combustion chamber, rather than pintle injectors used on the previous Merlin rocket engines that SpaceX mass-produced for its Falcon family of launch vehicles.

Starship 

Thirty-three sea-level variant Raptor engines will power the Super Heavy booster, while the Starship spacecraft contains six Raptor engines, three optimized for sea‑level and three optimized for vacuum. The bottom-most section, informally called the "skirt", houses the Raptor engines, as well as composite overwrapped pressure vessels that store helium gas used to spin up the Raptor turbopumps. Above that section are the liquid oxygen and liquid methane propellant tanks, separated by a "common dome" containing a small, spherical methane "header tank" used to contain propellant for landing.

Proposed Falcon 9 upper stage 
In January 2016, the United States Air Force (USAF) awarded a  development contract to SpaceX to develop a prototype version of its methane-fueled reusable Raptor engine for use on the upper stage of the Falcon 9 and Falcon Heavy launch vehicles. The contract required double-matching funding by SpaceX of at least . Work under the contract was expected to be completed no later than December 2018, and engine performance testing was planned to be completed at NASA's Stennis Space Center in Mississippi under US Air Force supervision. The USAF contract called only for the development and build of a single prototype engine with a series of ground tests, with no upper-stage launch vehicle design funded by the contract. The Air Force was working with the US Congress in February 2016 to pursue new launch systems.

In October 2017 the US Air Force (USAF) awarded a  modification for the development of the Raptor engine prototype for the Evolved Expendable Launch Vehicle program, with work under that contract expected to be completed by April 2018.

As a DoD military project, little technical detail was ever publicly released about the USAF second stage engine or the results of the prototype build and test program. The prototype however was to be designed to serve the theoretical purpose of servicing an upper stage that could be used on the existing Falcon 9 and Falcon Heavy launch vehicles, with liquid methane and liquid oxygen, propellants, a full-flow staged combustion cycle, and explicitly to be a reusable engine.

Comparison to other engines

See also 
Comparison of orbital rocket engines
SpaceX Mars program
SpaceX rocket engines
SpaceX Starship
SpaceX Starship development history

References

External links 

SpaceX Raptor Engine Test on 25 September 2016, SciNews, video, September 2016.
GPUs to Mars: Full-scale Simulation of SpaceX's Mars Rocket Engine, Adam Lichtl and Steven Jones, GPU Technology Conference, spring 2015.
unofficial raptor engine log infographic

Rocket engines using methane propellant
SpaceX rocket engines
Rocket engines using full flow staged combustion cycle
Rocket engines of the United States
SpaceX Starship